Persoonia rufa is a species of flowering plant in the family Proteaceae and is endemic to the a restricted area of New South Wales.

Description
Flowering occurs from December to February and the fruit is a drupe that is green or green with purple stripes.

Taxonomy and naming
Persoonia rufa was first formally described in 1991 by Peter H. Weston and Lawrie Johnson from a specimen collected in the Gibraltar Range National Park in 1990 and the description was published in Telopea. The specific epithet (rufa) refers to the reddish hairs on the young branchlets.

Distribution and habitat
This geebung is restricted to the Gibraltar Range National Park where it grows in eucalypt forest on soils derived from granite.

References

rufa
Flora of New South Wales
Plants described in 1991
Taxa named by Lawrence Alexander Sidney Johnson
Taxa named by Peter H. Weston